Kabul Shahi is a term used to denote two former non-Muslim dynasties in Kabul:

Turk Shahis (665–850 CE) 
Hindu Shahi (850–1026 CE)